Yeniaslanbaşar is a village in the central district of Şırnak Province in Turkey. The village is populated by Kurds of the Botikan tribe and had a population of 2,975 in 2021.

The six hamlets of Ballıca, Oğlakçı, Samanlık, Türkmen, Uzakçay and Üveyik are attached to Yeniaslanbaşar.

References 

Kurdish settlements in Şırnak Province
Villages in Şırnak District